Serene Machine is the seventh solo album by Australian guitarist and songwriter Ed Kuepper recorded in 1993 and released on the Hot label. It received an ARIA Award for 'Best Independent Release' at the ARIA Music Awards of 1994.

Reception
The album spent one week in the Australian Recording Industry Association Albums Chart in 1993 at No. 45. Serene Machine was awarded an ARIA for the Best Independent Release at the ARIA Music Awards of 1994.

Track listing
(All compositions by Ed Kuepper except as indicated)
 "When She's Down" – 3:09 
 "Sleepy Head (Serene Machine)" – 4:00 
 "Who's Been Talking?" – 2:45 
 "It's Happened Before" – 3:48 
 "I Wish You Were Here" – 3:01 
 "Maria Peripatetica" (Traditional) – 3:36 
 "Sounds Like Mysterious Wind" – 3:19 
 "Reasons" – 3:54 
 "This Hideous Place" – 3:12 
 "(You) Don't Know What To Steal" – 3:47 
 "You Can't Please Everybody (Sweete Reprise)" – 4:00 
 "Married To My Lazy Life" – 2:24

Charts

Personnel
Ed Kuepper – vocals, guitar
Mark Dawson – drums, percussion
Sir Alfonso – bass guitar
Artie Sledge – guitar, bass guitar
The Hub Matinee Choral Society, The Socialist Republic of Newtown's People's Choir – vocals

References

Hot Records albums
Ed Kuepper albums
1993 albums
ARIA Award-winning albums